The men's 800 metres T54 event at the 2020 Summer Paralympics in Tokyo, took place on 2 September 2021.

Records
Prior to the competition, the existing records were as follows:

Results

Heats
Heat 1 took place on 2 September 2021, at 11:49:

Heat 2 took place on 2 September 2021, at 11:56:

Heat 3 took place on 2 September 2021, at 12:03:

Final
The final took place on 2 September, at 20:32:

References

Men's 800 metres T54
2021 in men's athletics